New Morning is an album led by jazz trumpeter Johnny Coles which was recorded in 1982 and released by the Criss Cross Jazz label.

Reception

The AllMusic review by Scott Yanow states "Best-remembered for being part of Charles Mingus' 1964 Sextet, Coles had continued growing as a trumpeter through the years while keeping his brittle sound and advanced hard bop style ... The fresh material and Coles' enthusiastic solos make this an album worth picking up."

Track listing
All compositions by Johnny Coles except where noted
 "Super 80" (Charles Davis) – 9:58
 "Sound of Love" (Charles Mingus) – 6:38
 "Mister B." – 6:56
 "New Morning" – 6:11
 "United" (Wayne Shorter) – 5:41
 "I Don't Know Yet" – 6:31

Personnel
Johnny Coles – trumpet
Horace Parlan − piano
Reggie Johnson − bass
Billy Hart – drums

References

Johnny Coles albums
1983 albums
Criss Cross Jazz albums